Gérard de Nooijer (born 4 April 1969) is a Dutch football manager and former player.

Playing career
De Nooijer played as a defender for Sparta Rotterdam (1988–1998), SC Heerenveen (1998–2003), Feyenoord Rotterdam (2003–2004) and FC Dordrecht (2004–2005).

Coaching career
In the 2020–21 season, he worked as assistant coach with Sparta Rotterdam.

Personal life
He is the twin brother of striker Dennis de Nooijer, who also played professional football during the late 1980s and 1990s.

His son Bradley de Nooijer is now a professional footballer.

References

External links
  Profile
  Profile 

1969 births
Living people
Dutch footballers
Sparta Rotterdam players
SC Heerenveen players
FC Dordrecht players
Feyenoord players
Dutch twins
Association football defenders
Twin sportspeople
Sportspeople from Vlissingen
Footballers from Zeeland
FC Dordrecht managers
Eerste Divisie managers
Sparta Rotterdam non-playing staff